Wesleyan University is a private liberal arts university in Middletown, Connecticut. Founded in 1831 as a men's college under the auspices of the Methodist Episcopal Church and with the support of prominent residents of Middletown, the college was the first institution of higher education to be named after John Wesley, the founder of Methodism. It is now a secular institution.

The college accepted female applicants from 1872 to 1909, but did not become fully co-educational until 1970. Before full co-education, Wesleyan alumni and other supporters of women's education established Connecticut College for women in 1912. Wesleyan, along with Amherst and Williams colleges, is part of "The Little Three", also traditionally referred to as the Little Ivies. Its teams compete athletically as a member of the NESCAC.

Wesleyan University has distinguished alumni in the arts and sciences, literature, politics and government, business, journalism, and academia. Its alumni include 13 Pulitzer Prize winners, 14 Rhodes scholars, three Truman scholars, three Guggenheim fellows, 156 Fulbright scholars, and seven MacArthur fellows. Additionally, four Nobel laureates have been associated with the university as faculty members.

Among its prominent alumni are politicians and political appointees: 34 members of the United States Congress, 16 presidential cabinet members, 11 governors, six directors and heads of U.S. federal agencies, two attorneys general of the United States, and one Associate Supreme Court Justice. Its alumni have also been successful in business, including several CEOs and founders of Fortune 500 companies.

History

Three histories of Wesleyan have been published, Wesleyan's First Century (1932) by Carl F. Price; Wesleyan University, 1831–1910: Collegiate Enterprise in New England (1999); and Wesleyan University, 1910-1970, Academic Ambition and Middle-Class America (2015), both of the latter written by David B. Potts. Before Wesleyan was founded, a military academy founded by Captain Alden Partridge existed on the land, consisting of the campus's North and South Colleges. As this academy failed, New England Methodists bought it and transformed it into a scholarly institution. Wesleyan was founded in 1831 as an all-male Methodist college by the Methodist conference. It was led by Willbur Fisk, its first president. Despite its name, Wesleyan was never totally a denominational seminary, but it did feature heavy Methodist influence in its curriculum and campus religious life. Early in Wesleyan's development, the administration had to balance their own scholarly and academic interests with those of the staff and students which transitioned from the previous Alden Partridge military academy. Despite this, it remained a leader in educational progress throughout its early history. In the 1870s and 1880s, Wesleyan began gaining a regional reputation for its creative extracurricular pursuits- particularly in music and writing. It built Judd Hall in 1909, which was named after alumnus Orange Judd, and was one of the earliest comprehensive science buildings devoted exclusively to undergraduate science instruction on any American college or university campus.

It has maintained a larger library collection than institutions comparable in size. The Wesleyan student body numbered about 300 in 1910 and had grown to 800 in 1960. Time described the latter figure as "small" for a university.

Although Wesleyan developed as a peer of Amherst and Williams colleges, until the 1970s it continued to be the smallest of the Little Three institutions. At that time it began to expand its programs, qualifying as a university with graduate programs and becoming larger than the other two.

In 1872, the university became one of the first U.S. colleges to attempt coeducation by admitting a small number of female students, a venture then known as the "Wesleyan Experiment". "In 1909, the board of trustees voted to stop admitting women as undergraduates, fearing that the school was losing its masculine image and that women would not be able to contribute to the college financially after graduation the way men could." Given that concern, Wesleyan ceased to admit women. From 1912 to 1970, Wesleyan operated again as an all-male college.

Wesleyan became independent of the Methodist church in 1937. In 2000, the university was designated as a historic Methodist site.

Beginning in the late 1950s, president Victor Lloyd Butterfield began an ambitious program to reorganize the university according to Butterfield's "College Plan." This resembled Harvard's house system and Yale's colleges. Undergraduate study would be divided into seven smaller residential colleges, with their own faculty and centralized graduate studies. Doctoral programs and a Center for Advanced Studies (later renamed the Center for the Humanities) were included in this reorganization.

The building program begun under this system created three residential colleges on Foss Hill (the Foss Hill dormitories), followed by three more residential colleges (the Lawn Avenue dormitories, now called the Butterfield Colleges). Although the structures were built, only four of the proposed academic programs were begun. Two of those continue today: the College of Letters and the College of Social Studies. Butterfield proved effective at fund raising: by 1960 Wesleyan had the largest endowment, per student, of any college or university in America, and a student-faculty ratio of 7:1.

Butterfield's successors, Edwin Deacon Etherington (class of 1948) and Colin Goetze Campbell, completed many of the innovations begun during Butterfield's administration, including the return of women in numbers equal to men; a quadrupling in the total area of building space devoted to laboratory, studio, and performing arts instruction; and a dramatic rise in the racial, ethnic, and religious diversity and size of the student body.

The university and several of its admissions deans were featured in Jacques Steinberg's 2002 book The Gatekeepers: Inside The Admissions Process of a Premier College. In the fall 2007 semester, Michael S. Roth, a 1978 graduate of Wesleyan and former president of the California College of the Arts, was inaugurated as the university's 16th president.

Campus

Wesleyan occupies a  campus, with over 340 buildings, including the five-building College Row; Olin Memorial Library (see below); Andrus Public Affairs Center; the Exley Science Center; Shanklin and Hall-Atwater Laboratories; the Van Vleck Observatory; Fayerweather with Beckham Hall; Russell House, a National Historic Landmark; the Allbritton Center; the Butterfield dormitories; the Fauver Field dormitories; and the 11-building Center for the Arts complex.

When Wesleyan University was founded in 1831, it took over a campus on which two buildings, North College and South College, had already been built in 1825. They were originally constructed by the City of Middletown for use by Captain Partridge's American Literary, Scientific, and Military Academy. In 1829, after the Connecticut legislature declined it a charter to grant college degrees, Capt. Alden Partridge moved his academy to Northfield, Vermont. The academy later became Norwich University and the Middletown buildings were acquired by Wesleyan. The book, Norwich University, 1819-1911, Vol. I (1911), provides the following description of South College (originally called the Lyceum) and North College (called the Barracks).

These structures were constructed out of brown sandstone that was mined from quarries in Portland, Connecticut. The "Barracks" was four stories high, 150 feet long and 52 feet wide, with a large attic and basement. Halls extended the full length of the building. The "Lyceum" was located 20 feet south of the Barracks, was three stories high, with a basement partly above the ground. At the front of the building was a tower 14×16 feet and 73 feet high. The basement floor was used for an arsenal and laboratory and the first and second floors for classrooms; the third floor called the "Hall of the Lyceum" was used as a chapel and drill room, and for public services.

The original North College was destroyed in a fire in 1906, but South College survived, being converted into offices that same year. The cupola and the belfry, which contains the Wesleyan Carillon, was designed by Henry Bacon and was added in 1916.

The original core buildings of the campus were North College and South College. North College, Nassau Hall-type building seen in most early American college campuses, was replaced after a fire in 1909 with the current North College. South College is the sole building from the beginning of the college. These two buildings were the first two in a line of six later called College Row. The other buildings of row include the recently renovated Memorial Chapel, the original college library (now a theater), and Judd Hall. Adjacent to College Row, Olin Library, Harriman Hall, Shanklin Hall, and the former Hall Chemistry Building were designed by the architectural firm of McKim, Mead, and White as a set (with Clark Hall and a never-built sixth building) to form a quadrangle.

The northern end of High Street contains several large buildings that were former private residences, a few of which were exceptional architectural examples. These include Russell House, a National Historic Landmark, two Alsop family houses, (one is currently the African-American Studies center with student housing; the other is the Davison Art Center), the Davison infirmary, a second Russell family house that contains the University Development Office, and Downey House. High Street, which is the old center of campus, was once described by Charles Dickens as "the most beautiful street in America".

Recent building initiatives include the Freeman Athletic Center (which includes a 50-m swimming pool, the Spurrier-Snyder Rink for hockey, the 1,200-seat Silloway Gymnasium, the  Andersen Fitness Center, and the Rosenbaum Squash Center with eight courts); the Center for Film Studies; and a multibuilding renovation project creating a Humanities District on the east side of High Street between Fisk Hall and Russell House, which includes facilities for the departments of English, Romance Languages, the College of Letters, Classical Studies, Philosophy, and Art and Art History. The Allbritton Center (previously the Davenport Student Center, and before that Scott Lab) opened in the fall of 2009 and houses the Allbritton Center for the Study of Public Life, the Shapiro Creative Writing Center, the Quantitative Analysis Center, and the Feminist, Gender, and Sexuality Studies Program.

The Usdan University Center, which opened in September 2007, has dining facilities for students and faculty. It also houses seminar and meeting spaces, the Wesleyan Student Assembly, Student Activities and Leadership Development Office, University Events and Scheduling Office, the post office, and the computer store. In 2012, 41 Wyllys Ave. opened in the former squash building as the new home for the College of Letters, Art History Program, and the Wesleyan Career Center.

Undergraduate academics
Wesleyan's 46 undergraduate academic departments offer over 900 courses each semester and more than 900 individual tutorials. Wesleyan also offers 13 interdisciplinary programs and nine Academic Centers. Undergraduates receive the Bachelor of Arts in one (or more) of 45 major concentrations. As many as a third of these majors are interdisciplinary in structure. Wesleyan began offering minors in February 2012 and at present offers eleven minors; more minors are under consideration. Certificates are offered in eleven fields. According to the university, "Certificate programs at Wesleyan supplement (but do not replace) a major. A certificate requires an interdisciplinary set of courses that prepares a student for postgraduate work in a specified interdisciplinary field." In addition, double majors are popular and up to 40% of Wesleyan's graduates are double majors. Students may triple major as well. Undergraduates can also pursue a custom-designed major, known as a University Major. According to the Columbia Encyclopedia, "Wesleyan is noted for its undergraduate programs of tutorial instruction and independent study." Approximately 52% of students undertake independent study.

Wesleyan offers 3–2 programs in engineering with the California Institute of Technology and Columbia University's School of Engineering. These programs allow undergraduates to receive degrees in five years from both Wesleyan (B.A.) and Caltech or Columbia (B.Sc., Engineering). Additionally, Wesleyan offers a BA/MA Program in the sciences leading to a bachelor's degree in the fourth year and a master's degree in the fifth year. Tuition for the fifth year of the master's degree is waived. Undergraduates can pursue studies in pre-medicine, pre-law, and pre-business through any major. Most classes at Wesleyan are small; the predominant class size for undergraduates is 10–19 students, and the student to faculty ratio is 8 to 1.

The university has described a set of general principles that define its approach to undergraduate education summed up in ten essential capabilities that the faculty believe every undergraduate should possess when he or she graduates from Wesleyan. Students may acquire these capabilities through numerous courses throughout the curriculum designated by the faculty as satisfying specific capabilities and through extra- or co-curricular activities. Writing is emphasized across the disciplines and 99% of undergraduates participate in Wesleyan's Writing Across the Curriculum program.

Wesleyan does not require undergraduates to take prescribed courses. Freshmen are offered First Year Initiative seminars, which are designed to prepare them for upper-level courses by emphasizing writing, analysis, discussion, and critical thinking. Undergraduates are encouraged in the first two years of study to take a minimum of two courses from two different departments in each of three areas: natural sciences and mathematics, humanities and the arts, and social and behavioral sciences. In the second two years, undergraduates are expected to take one course in each of these three areas. Fulfillment of the General Education Expectations in conjunction with co-curricular activities provides simultaneous acquisition of the ten essential capabilities. "A student who does not meet these [general education] expectations by the time of graduation will not be eligible for University honors, Phi Beta Kappa, honors in general scholarship [honors or high honors], and for honors in certain departments."

Its most popular undergraduate majors, based on 2021 graduates, were:
Econometrics and Quantitative Economics (67)
Psychology (65)
Political Science and Government (64)
English Language and Literature (48)
Behavioral Neuroscience (38)
Film/Cinema/Media Studies (38)

College of East Asian Studies

The College of East Asian Studies (CEAS) is the home of East Asian studies at Wesleyan University. The college was established in July 2014 through the merger of three academic units: the Asian Languages and Literatures Department, the East Asian Studies Program, and the Mansfield Freeman Center for East Asian Studies.

The CEAS Major is a three-year long major that is designed to give students deep knowledge about a particular East Asian culture (China, Japan, Korea) that are grounded in a particular discipline. Majors are also required to gain some knowledge of the other East Asian countries that might not be the focus of their study.

College of the Environment

The College of the Environment (COE), created in 2009, integrates the following components: 1) a curricular component, including the newly established environmental studies major, the environmental studies certificate, and a senior capstone project; 2) a Think Tank of Wesleyan faculty, scholars of prominence, and undergraduates whose aim is to produce scholarly work that will influence national and international thinking and action on critical environmental issues; and 3) the Collaborative Research Initiative (CRI), which is designed to encourage COE majors with the most potential to undertake environmental research. The threefold goal of the CRI combines: a) preparing students for senior research work; b) recruiting students of exceptional skill for participation in the COE Think Tank; and c) preparing students for research careers in environmental studies, as well as facilitating internships (non-credit) to provide students with research opportunities and "real world" experience (e.g., internships with governmental organizations, NGO's, and businesses, etc.).

College of Film and the Moving Image 
The university's Film Studies program, consistently ranked in the top ten among the best programs in the world, is led by film historian Jeanine Basinger. In 2008, Vanity Fair said: "This tiny Connecticut University, with a total enrollment of 2,700, has turned out a shockingly disproportionate number of Hollywood movers and shakers." Similarly, in 2008, Variety magazine noted Basinger's contribution to the film industry through her work in the Wesleyan Film Studies program, and the large number of alumni of the program now working in Hollywood. University students, biographers, media experts, and scholars from around the world may have full access to The Wesleyan Cinema Archives, which document the film industry during the 20th century and contain the personal papers and film related materials of Ingrid Bergman, Frank Capra, Clint Eastwood, Federico Fellini, Elia Kazan, Frank Perry, Roberto Rossellini, Robert Saudek, Martin Scorsese, Gene Tierney, Raoul Walsh, and John Waters, amongst others.

In February 2013, Wesleyan announced the creation of a new College of Film and the Moving Image, incorporating the Film Studies Department, the Center for Film Studies, the Cinema Archives and the Wesleyan Film Series.

College of Integrative Sciences

The College of Integrative Sciences (CIS) is the most recent interdisciplinary college at Wesleyan, founded in 2014. The CIS provides students with an interdisciplinary education in the sciences, and combines it with hands-on problem solving skills in research. To build interdisciplinary expertise, students must complete both a traditional major in science or mathematics, as well as a "linked" major that combines components from other disciplines to form a coherent plan of study.

College of Letters

The College of Letters (COL) is an interdisciplinary humanities program offering a three-year B.A. major for the integrative study of European literature, history, and philosophy, from antiquity to the present. During their time in the major, students explore the evolution of ideas, languages, narratives, beliefs, and ideologies associated with the Mediterranean, Europe, and the Atlantic as effective tools for pursuing an historically informed and critical understanding of the contemporary world and its various forms of cultural, artistic, and intellectual expression. The college emphasizes a pedagogy of collaboration, interdisciplinary inquiry, and creative exploration around the idea of the "Educated Imagination." At the heart of the program is a series of five colloquia, interdisciplinary co-taught seminars that students take together with their class-year cohort. The colloquia seminars acquaint students with significant (both well-known and understudied) works, ideas, and events in (i) antiquity, (ii) the medieval period, (iii) the early modern period, (iv) the 18th/19th centuries, and (v) the 20th/21st centuries. Students learn with and from one another; they achieve proficiency in a foreign language of their choice; they receive narrative evaluations instead of letter grades; and they pursue a scholarly or creative senior capstone project. In the fall semester of their junior year students complete comprehensive examinations on the three colloquia taken up to that point, and in the spring semester of their junior year they study abroad in a country tied to their foreign language of choice. During their senior year, students write a thesis (full-year project) or an essay (half-year project).

College of Social Studies

The College of Social Studies (CSS) was founded in 1959, combining the fields of history, economics, government, and philosophy. It emphasizes intellectual independence and collaborative and social ties between faculty and students. Students take 5.5 of the program's 10.5 (thesis-writing students take 11.5) required credits during their sophomore year. Sophomore year focuses on the development of modern Western society from historical, economic, social and political perspectives, and culminates with comprehensive final exams. Junior year has a more global focus, while Seniors are required to write an Honors thesis (full year) or a Senior Essay.

Science and mathematics
According to National Science Foundation (NSF) research and data, the university ranks first nationally among liberal arts colleges in federal funding for research in the sciences and mathematics. Wesleyan is the sole undergraduate liberal arts college to be designated a Molecular Biophysics Predoctoral Research Training Center by the National Institutes of Health (NIH); other centers are located at research universities such as Stanford, University of California at Berkeley, Johns Hopkins, Harvard University Medical School, Duke, Cornell, and the University of Pennsylvania. Medical school acceptances of Wesleyan graduates have historically averaged above 90%, and in some years Wesleyan has recorded an acceptance rate of 100%.

Wesleyan was one of the first colleges to establish a separate Molecular Biology & Biochemistry department, and has extensive laboratory facilities. All of the science departments, mathematics & computer science, and psychology support original post-graduate research programs. An additional laboratory building is in the planning stages.

Astronomy program

The Astronomy department graduates more astronomy and astrophysics majors than any other liberal arts college in the country. The program is based at Van Vleck Observatory, built in 1914, which is on Foss Hill near the center of the Wesleyan campus.

Science in Society
Wesleyan's Science in Society Program (SISP) is an interdisciplinary major that encourages integrated study of the sciences and medicine as practices, institutions, and intellectual achievements, among other areas of study. The program has three components: science courses, SISP courses, and an area of concentration (which may include a major in one of the sciences). The program encourages students to integrate technical scientific understanding with a grasp of the multiple contexts in which scientific knowledge is applied, and the issues at stake in its application.

Music
Wesleyan's program in World Music, described as "one of the top schools in the country for the study of ethnomusicology" and music, employs leading teaching musicians and ethnomusicologists, representing a variety of musical traditions. European (including Medieval, Renaissance, Baroque, Classical, Romantic, Impressionistic, Expressionistic, Neoclassical, Neoromantic, Gebrauchsmusik, 20th century, Contemporary, and Opera), South Indian Classical, Indonesian (including Javanese Gamelan), East Asian, classical Chinese music, Korean music, Japanese music, including Taiko drums; West African, Caribbean, African-American, as well as Experimental music have been components of the music department since the 1960s. The Experimental music work at Wesleyan dates to the residency of John Cage at the university. He was followed by composers Alvin Lucier, Ron Kuivila, and Jon Barlow. Composer Beatrice Witkin's papers are archived at Wesleyan.

Among universities, Wesleyan "has one of the largest and most diverse collections of world musical instruments," many of which are depicted in the university's "Virtual Instrument Museum."

Theater

Wesleyan's highly regarded theater program has two theater facilities: the Theatre in the Center for the Arts, a 400-seat space; and the '92 Theater, home to Second Stage, which solely student-run volunteer theater organization. Second Stage produces at least one performance per weekend during the school year, either in the fully equipped black-box Patricelli '92 Theater, or alternative spaces around campus. Second Stage produces dance as well as theater performances. The Patricelli '92 Theater (then simply '92 Theater) became available for student-run productions when the Center for the Arts opened in 1974, providing the Theater Department with a state-of-the-art facility.

International study
Wesleyan sponsors, among others, international programs in France, Italy, and Spain, and has special relationships with programs in Japan. Nearly 45 percent of Wesleyan students study abroad through 150 programs located in 50 countries worldwide."

Twelve College Exchange
Many students participate in the Twelve College Exchange program, which allows for study for a semester or a year at another of the twelve college campuses: Amherst, Bowdoin, Connecticut College, Dartmouth, Mount Holyoke, Smith, Trinity, Vassar, Wellesley, Wheaton, and the Williams/Mystic Seaport Program in Maritime Studies.

Post-graduate academics
Departmental programs
Wesleyan has 11 graduate departmental programs in the sciences, mathematics, computer science, psychology, and music. Graduates receive the Master of Arts or Doctor of Philosophy degrees. Like in many traditional liberal arts colleges in the United States, all of Wesleyan's master's and bachelor's degrees are designated "of Arts" by historical precedent, regardless of the field of study.

Graduate Liberal Studies Program
In 1953, Wesleyan was the first university to begin a program leading to a Master of Arts in Liberal Studies degree, called the Graduate Liberal Studies Program. To date, hundreds of educational institutions have followed suit with similar programs. The program provides for interdisciplinary graduate study independent of the undergraduate academic departments.

A large proportion of G.L.S.P. students are public and private school teachers from the region, and the others are in different professions or are otherwise augmenting their graduate studies. The Graduate Liberal Studies Program offers both the Master of Arts in Liberal Studies (MALS) and the Master of Philosophy (M.Phil.) degree. The former requires 36 credit hours of study and may culminate in a capstone project or thesis. The latter requires 30 credit hours of academic study and a thesis.

Massive Open Online Courses (MOOCs)
Beginning in 2012, Wesleyan became the first small liberal arts college to partner with a private consortium to design and offer free public access online courses. Wesleyan teaches online courses in Math, Computer Science, Law, Psychology, and Literature, as well as other subjects. In January 2015, total worldwide student enrollment in online courses taught by Wesleyan faculty exceeded 1,000,000.

Academic profile

Admissions

For the Class of 2026 (enrolling Fall 2022), Wesleyan received 14,521 applications and accepted 2,013 (13.9%). The median SAT score for admitted freshmen was 770 for math and 750 for evidence-based reading and writing. The median ACT score was 34 for the composite. Since 2014, Wesleyan has been test optional.

Admission standards at Wesleyan are considered "most selective" by U.S. News & World Report. The Princeton Review gives the university an admissions selectivity rating of 96 out of 99.

Rankings

In the 2023 U.S. News & World Report rankings, Wesleyan University is tied for 18th overall among national liberal arts colleges, first in "Best Colleges for Veterans", 17th in "Best Value Schools", and tied for 60th in "Top Performers on Social Mobility". Wesleyan University is accredited by the New England Commission of Higher Education.

In the 2023 Forbes ranking of 650 American colleges, which combines national research universities, liberal arts colleges and military academies in a single survey, Wesleyan University is ranked 51st overall and 8th among liberal arts colleges alone. In another recent Forbes ranking, Wesleyan placed ninth nationally and third among liberal arts colleges. According to a study entitled "Revealed Preference Ranking" published by the National Bureau of Economic Research, Wesleyan ranks No. 22 among all colleges and universities, and No. 5 among liberal arts colleges only. The stated purpose of the NBER study was to produce a ranking system that "would be difficult for a college to manipulate" by basing it on the actual demonstrated preferences of highly meritorious students. Wesleyan was listed on the Foundation for Individual Rights in Education's 2016 "10 Worst Colleges for Free Speech".

Washington Monthly ranked Wesleyan third in 2022, out of 203 liberal arts colleges in the U.S., based on its contribution to the public good, as measured by social mobility, research, and promoting public service.

In 2019 Kiplinger ranked Wesleyan 16th of the 149 best value liberal arts colleges in the United States.

The university is notable for the success with African American students, in which Wesleyan is one of nine universities with a black graduation rate above 90 percent.

After graduation
Wesleyan has been noted as one of the most productive baccalaureate colleges in the United States in the undergraduate origins of PhDs in all fields of study, with exceptional productivity in undergraduates pursuing doctorates in the physical sciences, geosciences, life sciences, psychology, social sciences, and humanities. According to studies undertaken by the National Science Foundation, the National Institutes of Health and other federal agencies, for the years 1999–2008, 1999–2003, and 1994–2003, Wesleyan undergraduates were second in receiving PhDs among all liberal arts colleges in the nation. For example, the university produces more history doctorates per undergraduate history major than any other liberal arts college or national research university in the United States (with the exception of the University of Chicago which tied for first place with Wesleyan in a study (by the American Historical Association) of history PhDs earned between 1989 and 2002).

According to a 2003 summary, women constituted 55.3% of Wesleyan's undergraduates who received doctorates. Similarly, "[a]ccording to the 2000 to 2004 Survey of Earned Doctorates, women accounted for nearly 63% of the doctorates received by Wesleyan alumni/ae in the sciences (calculated either including psychology or including both psychology and the social sciences) and earned 53% of the doctorates in the sciences when psychology and the social sciences were excluded."

Eighty percent of Wesleyan alumni attend graduate or professional school within five years of graduation. In 2011, Newsweek ranked Wesleyan eighteenth in their list of the nation's best colleges and universities for paying back graduates in future earnings and quality experience.

Wesleyan graduates are awarded external fellowships, including Fulbright, Goldwater, Marshall, Rhodes, Truman, and Watson. For the years 2004 through 2012, for example, Wesleyan was named a "Top Producer of Fulbright Awards for American Students" by the Institute for International Education. For the years 2007 through 2011, a total of 42 Wesleyan students and alumni received scholarships under the Fulbright program. 
The university has had at least 87 Watson Fellows since the inception of the program in 1968.

Libraries

Wesleyan University has an extensive library collection, most of which is housed in Olin Memorial Library, which has more than 1.8 million volumes and approximately 10,000 serial subscriptions. Wesleyan's first library was Rich Hall (now '92 Theater), which was built just after the Civil War.
Olin Library was designed by the firm of McKim, Mead, and White, built in 1925–27 and dedicated in 1928. Olin originally was much smaller and also contained classroom space. It has since been enlarged twice, the last time in 1992.

The second largest library on campus is the Science Library, which houses over two hundred fifty thousand volumes of science abstracts, books, journals, monographs, papers, periodicals, and surveys. The Science Library also has a large collection called the Cutter Collection, which is an older private collection of mostly 19th century English language books of European literature, art, and culture.

The Art Library is housed on the second floor of Olin Library. Davison Art Center holds the Print Reference Library. There is also a Music Library (which includes scores and recordings and the World Music Archives) and several department libraries.

Davison Art Center

Wesleyan University's Davison Art Center is in Alsop House, which is designated a U.S. National Historic Landmark. The Art Center has a large collection consisting primarily of works on paper, including 18,000 prints, 6,000 photographs, several hundred drawings, a small number of paintings, and three-dimensional objects (including artists' books, sculptures, and other objects). The print collection is considered to be one of the most important at an American university, with works by Dürer, Goya, Rembrandt, Manet, and others. Parts of the collection are regularly exhibited to the public. Some objects have been made available for loan to selected museums in the United States and abroad. Students at Wesleyan in many departments make use of the DAC collection for class assignments, viewings, and individual research projects under the guidance of faculty.

The Art Center's publications program produces catalogs concerning DAC collections and gallery exhibitions. In general, one catalog is published annually. This program affords students the opportunity to take part in carefully mentored student authorship. Additionally, it is a critical component of the museum's educational program, which also includes student museum internships and solely student-curated exhibitions.

Wesleyan University Press

The Wesleyan University Press is well regarded for its books of poetry and books on music, dance and performance, American studies, and film. The press also connects the campus to the larger intellectual and cultural world through the presence of its authors on campus, whether they are faculty, visiting scholars, guest lecturers, or participants in Wesleyan's Distinguished Writers Series or Writers Conference.

Student life

Cannon Scrap

In the late 1860s, a yearly contest, the "Cannon Scrap," began between the freshmen, whose mission it was to fire the Douglas Cannon on February 22, and the sophomores, who were charged with foiling the effort. In 1957, the tradition of stealing the cannon began in earnest.

Religious life
Until June 2020, the university employed a Jewish rabbi, a Catholic priest, a Protestant chaplain, and a Muslim chaplain. At the end of the Academic year 2020, the positions of Protestant and Muslim chaplains were vacated and the university elected not to fill them, citing budget cuts necessitated by the COVID-19 pandemic. The university proposal is that current chaplain positions "will all be gradually phased out until one chaplain remains to oversee all aspects of University religious life. Paid student intern positions will be created to assist this chaplain in managing student religious groups and redirecting students to religious services in Middletown."

There is also program housing for Buddhists, Muslims, Christians, and Jews. Within the Memorial Chapel there are meditation rooms. There is a Wesleyan program in Israel.

Athletics

Wesleyan is a member of the Division III New England Small College Athletic Conference (NESCAC), fielding intercollegiate varsity teams in 29 sports. It competes against traditional Little Three rivals Amherst and Williams. Approximately 600 students participate in intercollegiate varsity sports each year. Wesleyan is one of the 39 founding members of the NCAA. Wesleyan's football and baseball field, Andrus Field, is the oldest continuously used American football field in the world and the oldest continuously used baseball field in the world.

With alumnus including Bill Belichick, Eric Mangini, and Field Yates, the school has been described by ESPN as a "hotbed for great football minds." Led by coach John Raba the winningest lacrosse coach in NESCAC history the Wesleyan's Men's Lacrosse team won the Division III NCAA championship title in 2018. It was the first National Championship in school history.

Amos Magee helped lead Wesleyan University to an ECAC Soccer Championship and school-best record of 15–1–1 in 1991, and is the Cardinals' all-time leading scorer (35 goals and 85 points). He was a National Soccer Coaches Association of America (NSCAA) Division III All-American in 1992, four times was named all-New England,and was inducted into the Wesleyan University Hall of Fame.

Student groups and organizations
In February 2011, U.S. News & World Report described the university as one of "20 Colleges Where It's Easiest to Get Involved" with a "Students per Club" ratio of "11.66". At that time there were around 270 student groups available to the 3148 enrolled students.

Wesleyan Student Assembly

The Wesleyan Student Assembly (WSA) is a body of 38 students elected annually to represent Wesleyan University's undergraduate student body. The members of the assembly serve as student advocates in all areas of the university, including matters related to student life, academics, university finances, and campus facilities.

Debate
The Debate Society was founded in 1903 and later named in honor of Woodrow Wilson, who had been a professor at Wesleyan between 1888 and 1890 and who "became deeply involved in extracurricular student activities such as the [Wesleyan] debate society." He "stimulated students to organize opportunity for debate through a House of Commons similar to the one he had started at Johns Hopkins in 1884." It captured first place in past years at the annual Brown, Columbia, Georgetown, Harvard, Princeton, Tufts and Williams tournaments, among others, and has reached the semi-finals of all other major tournaments. The Debate Society also has competed internationally, and in 1990 the society won a national championship and ninth place in the World Student Debating Championships.

Environmental
Another student group is the Environmental Organizers' Network (EON), which campaigns on environmental issues. Wesleyan also owns a tract of land that is used as Long Lane Farm, a  organic vegetable farm run by students.

Publications
Some of the oldest and most visible student groups are campus publications, including a bi-weekly newspaper, The Wesleyan Argus and a periodical, Hermes, the university's oldest student-run progressive publication. Until 2008, the student body published the Olla Podrida which was originally a quarterly newspaper in the late 1850s, but became the college yearbook since the Civil War and the permanent establishment of the Argus as the campus newspaper. Wesleying is a student-run weblog that documents undergraduate life at Wesleyan, often receiving up to 10,000 page views a day. The Ankh, founded in 1985, is a twice-yearly publication composed entirely by Wesleyan students of color. Overall, at least "fifteen student publications are sent to press ... once a semester, ranging from the school newspaper, The Argus, to magazines of fiction, humor, women's issues, activism, and poetry."

Singing groups
Wesleyan was long known as the "Singing College of New England." The university's "tradition as a 'singing college' had its roots in the vitality of Methodist hymnody." Glee clubs were formed "for special occasions from the mid-1840s through the 1860s". In 1862, however, a university glee club made the first tour of Wesleyan singers. The Wesleyan glee club organized by students frequently traveled and performed from the mid-19th century through the mid-20th century and was considered among the best collegiate glee clubs in the late 19th century. It traveled widely giving concerts, including being received twice at the White House (in 1901 by President McKinley and again in 1928 by President Coolidge) and being recorded onto a phonograph record by Thomas Edison. University alumni published the first edition of The Wesleyan Song Book in 1901. Subsequently, the Glee Club twice won the National Intercollegiate Glee Club Competition at Carnegie Hall. Since the Glee Club's disbanding, the tradition of choral singing has been carried on by the Wesleyan Singers, later renamed the Wesleyan Concert Choir, and then renamed again The Wesleyan Ensemble Singers (2010). This tradition also continues today in several student-run a cappella groups on campus, including the Wesleyan Spirits, the university's oldest group. There are at least 10 groups that perform on campus regularly, with others occasionally created and disbanded.

Greek organizations and secretive societies

Wesleyan has chapters of Alpha Delta Phi, Alpha Psi Alpha, Chi Psi, Psi Upsilon, and Delta Kappa Epsilon (DKE).

In 2011, Rho Epsilon Pi sorority was founded at Wesleyan University in order to provide a social space for women on campus.

In September 2014, Wesleyan ordered all fraternities with on-campus housing to become co-educational within the next three years.
In 2015, Wesleyan University ordered the closure of the DKE fraternity house on High Street. In 2017, DKE won the claim against Wesleyan University in a court trial. The jury awarded damages of $386,000 to the Kent Literary Club, DKE's Wesleyan alumni chapter.

Secretive societies on campus include the Skull & Serpent, Theta Nu Epsilon,
Cloak, The Cannon Society, Pigs of Patio, and two Mystical Sevens.

Literary, media, and cultural references
More than 30 books have been published concerning the university, including: The Wesleyan Song Book, by Karl P. Harrington and Carl F. Price (1901);
 The Goose-Step: A Study of American Education, by Upton Sinclair (1923); Wesleyan's First Century With an Account of the Centennial Celebration, by Carl F. Price (1932); Wesleyan University, 1831–1910: Collegiate Enterprise in New England, by David B. Potts (1999); The Gatekeepers: Inside The Admissions Process of a Premier College, by Jacques Steinberg (2002); One Hundred Semesters: My Adventures as Student, Professor, and University President, and What I Learned along the Way, by William M. Chace (14th president of Wesleyan) (2006); A History of the Eclectic Society of Phi Nu Theta, 1837–1970, by William B.B. Moody (2007); Hidden Ivies: Thirty Colleges of Excellence, by Howard Greene and Matthew Greene (2000); Hidden Ivies: 50 Top Colleges that Rival the Ivy League, by Howard Greene and Matthew Greene (2009); Music at Wesleyan: From Glee Club to Gamelan by Mark Slobin (2010).

The main character, Girl, in the 2004 novel Citizen Girl, by the authors of The Nanny Diaries, is a graduate of Wesleyan. John Maher's 1995 work Thinker, Sailer, Brother, Spy: A Novel features a fictional look at the life of a professor (a principal character) in the "hothouse atmosphere of Wesleyan University...." Two of Robert Ludlum's novels are set partially at Wesleyan, The Matlock Paper much of the action takes place in and around the campus of a thinly disguised Wesleyan, and also The Chancellor Manuscript where Ludlum refers to Wesleyan as 'a wealthy but minor university'.

The 1963 comedic novel, Night and Silence Who is Here?, by novelist Pamela Hansford Johnson, is thought by many literary critics to be patterned humorously after Wesleyan's Institute for Advanced Studies (now the Center for the Humanities); the main characters comprise and parallel the cast of Shakespeare's Midsummer Night's Dream. The Eclectic Society, a play that premiered on 27 January 2010 at the Walnut Street Theatre is based upon the Eclectic Society at the university during the early 1960s. In the 2012 novel Dream School, by novelist Blake Nelson, the protagonist attends an eastern liberal arts college, Wellington College, modeled on Wesleyan.

Characters in several television series have been portrayed as Wesleyan students or graduates. They include 30 Rock, As the World Turns, How I Met Your Mother (characters Ted Mosby, Marshall Eriksen, Lily Aldrin), Buffy the Vampire Slayer, The West Wing, BoJack Horseman, and M*A*S*H.

The 1994 cult comedy film PCU was based on (and filmed in part at) Wesleyan, the alma mater of the screenplay's two writers, Adam Leff and Zak Penn, and represents "an exaggerated view of contemporary college life...." centering on a fictionalized version of the Eclectic Society, known in the film as "The Pit."

In the autumn of 2010, the Pulitzer prize-winning comic strip Doonesbury by Garry Trudeau featured the university in a series of daily strips.

In 2015, Rolling Stone published a long form feature on Wesleyan's drug culture titled "Inside the Wesleyan Molly Bust", where dozens of students overdosed on tainted ecstasy, leading to the expulsion of five students.

Notable alumni and faculty

Former Wesleyan faculty and affiliates V. S. Naipaul, Woodrow Wilson, and T. S. Eliot have been awarded Nobel Prizes. Gary Yohe, current professor of economics, won a 2007 Nobel Peace Prize. Satoshi Omura, Max Tishler Professor of Chemistry, was awarded the 2015 Nobel Prize for Medicine. Former faculty and affiliates Richard Wilbur, Mark Strand, and Donald Hall were United States Poets Laureate. Composers John Cage and Steve Lehman were both affiliated with the university. Film notables include Joss Whedon, a producer, director, screenwriter, comic book writer, and composer; Lin-Manuel Miranda, the creator of Hamilton, won a Pulitzer Prize, three Grammy Awards, two Emmy Awards, a MacArthur Fellowship, and three Tony Awards; Mike White, a filmmaker and creator of the award-winning show The White Lotus; and Michael Bay, film producer and director.

References

External links

Wesleying, an independent, student-produced blog about real students and real student life at Wesleyan University in Middletown, Connecticut

 
Liberal arts colleges in Connecticut
Buildings and structures in Middletown, Connecticut
Educational institutions established in 1831
Universities and colleges in Middlesex County, Connecticut
Universities and colleges affiliated with the Methodist Episcopal Church
Private universities and colleges in Connecticut